Salih Usar is the Minister of Public Works and Communications in the 20th Government of the Turkish Republic of Northern Cyprus, in the cabinet of Prime Minister Ferdi Sabit Soyer. He was appointed to his portfolios in April, 2005.

References

Year of birth missing (living people)
Living people
Government ministers of Northern Cyprus
Place of birth missing (living people)